Mary Veronica Kasser Mochary (born September 2, 1942 in Budapest, Hungary) is an American attorney and Republican Party politician from New Jersey. She served as mayor of Montclair, New Jersey and was the Republican nominee for United States Senate in 1984 to oppose incumbent Bill Bradley.

Early life and education
Mochary was born as Mary Veronica Kasser in Budapest in 1942 to Alexander and Elisabeth Kasser. Her father was the manager of the largest paper mill in Eastern Europe. The family left Hungary at the end of World War II, immigrating first to Mexico and then to the United States. They settled in Montclair, New Jersey when Mochary was nine years old. She attended Montclair State College High School, an experimental high school at Montclair State College (now Montclair State University). She graduated from Wellesley College in 1963 with a B.A. degree in economics and from the University of Chicago Law School in 1967 with a J.D. degree.

Career 
In 1980, Montclair's form of government changed from a five-member commission to a seven-member council. Mochary ran for the Council, and out of 28 candidates in the nonpartisan municipal election she received the most votes, leading to her selection as mayor of Montclair, New Jersey from 1980 to 1984.

State Republican leaders tried to recruit Mochary to run for Congress and to oppose New Jersey Senate President Carmen A. Orechio in 1983. She then emerged as a potential candidate to oppose Bill Bradley in the 1984 U.S. Senate race. After declaring her candidacy she defeated Robert Morris of Mantoloking in the Republican primary. The Almanac of American Politics called her an "attractive candidate" to run against Bradley. However, because of the life-threatening illness of her then husband Stephen Mochary, she stopped campaigning in October and traveled with her husband to Stanford, California for his heart transplant, which in 1985, was still considered an experimental operation. Stephen Mochary lived until 2001. She was defeated by Bradley in the general election, losing by a margin of 64.2% to 35.2%.

Mochary later served in the United States Department of State as principal deputy legal advisor to the secretary of state and special negotiator for real estate. She has also served as manager and trustee of the Kasser Family Foundation, overseeing a fund with assets of $2.5 million that awards scholarships to young artists.

Personal life 
In 1965 she married Stephen E. Mochary, also a lawyer, and they went into practice together as Mochary & Mochary in Montclair from 1970 to 1985. They have two children, Alexandra Kasser and Matthew Mochary.

References

External links 
 Biographical information for Mary V. Mochary from The Political Graveyard

1942 births
20th-century American lawyers
Living people
Mayors of Montclair, New Jersey
New Jersey lawyers
New Jersey Republicans
University of Chicago Law School alumni
Wellesley College alumni
Women mayors of places in New Jersey
Hungarian emigrants to the United States
20th-century American politicians
20th-century American women politicians
Candidates in the 1984 United States elections
20th-century American women lawyers